Live at Fenway Park is a live album by American singer-songwriter Jimmy Buffett and is one of a number of Jimmy Buffett sound board live albums recorded directly from the mixing console without further editing thus resembling bootleg recordings.

The album was recorded at Fenway Park ballpark in Boston, Massachusetts on September 10 and 12, 2004, two dates on Buffett's License to Chill Tour.  It was released in November 2005 on two compact discs on Mailboat 2115 and includes a DVD containing 55 minutes of footage from the two shows.  It was produced by Michael Utley, a member of Buffett's Coral Reefer Band.

Songs
The album includes all of the songs in Buffett's "Big 8" songs that he nearly always performs in concert.  Due to the location of the concert in the home stadium of Major League Baseball's Boston Red Sox, Buffett performed several related songs including baseball anthem "Take Me Out to the Ball Game," Red Sox' fan favorite "Sweet Caroline," originally by Neil Diamond, and "Respect," made popular by Aretha Franklin, alluding to the Red Sox success in 2004 (they would go on to win the 2004 World Series) after years of poor performance.  Buffett also performed "Boat Drinks" which he says is the only of his songs written in and about Boston.

Chart performance
Live at Fenway Park hit No. 41 on the American Billboard 200 album chart and No. 2 on the Independent Albums chart.

Track listing
Disc 1:
"Changes in Latitudes, Changes in Attitudes" (Jimmy Buffett) – 3:44
"The Great Filling Station Holdup" (Jimmy Buffett) – 4:23
"Pencil Thin Mustache" (Jimmy Buffett) – 3:27
"Fruitcakes" (Jimmy Buffett, Amy Lee) – 6:25
"License to Chill" (Jimmy Buffett, Mac McAnally, Al Anderson) – 4:17
"Son of a Son of a Sailor" (Jimmy Buffett) – 4:18
"Boat Drinks" (Jimmy Buffett) – 4:17
"Brown Eyed Girl" (Van Morrison) – 5:59
"Volcano" (Jimmy Buffett, Keith Sykes, Harry Dailey) – 4:08
"Why Don't We Get Drunk" (Jimmy Buffett) / "Sweet Caroline" (Neil Diamond) – 5:05
"Hey Good Lookin'" (Hank Williams) – 3:35
"Pascagoula Run" (Jimmy Buffett, Jay Oliver) – 4:09
"One Particular Harbour" (Jimmy Buffett, Bobby Holcomb) – 6:55

Disc 2:
"Respect" (Otis Redding) – 2:47
"Gypsies in the Palace" (Jimmy Buffett, Glenn Frey, Will Jennings) – 5:38
"Grapefruit Juicy Fruit" (Jimmy Buffett) – 4:03
"Come Monday" (Jimmy Buffett) – 4:27
"Jolly Mon Sing" (Jimmy Buffett, Michael Utley, Will Jennings) – 5:02
"Take Me Out to the Ball Game" (Jack Norworth, Albert Von Tilzer) – 1:44
"It's Five O'Clock Somewhere" (Jim "Moose" Brown, Don Rollins) – 3:44
"Cheeseburger in Paradise" (Jimmy Buffett) – 3:42
"Coast of Carolina" (Jimmy Buffett, Mac McAnally – 4:26
"Cuban Crime of Passion" (Jimmy Buffett, Tom Corcoran) – 5:26
"A Pirate Looks at Forty" (Jimmy Buffett) – 4:57
"Piece of Work" (William A. Kimbrough) – 4:14
"Margaritaville" (Jimmy Buffett) – 4:51
"Fins" (Jimmy Buffett, Barry Chance, Tom Corcoran, Deborah McColl) – 7:46
"Scarlet Begonias" Jerry Garcia, Robert Hunter – 4:10
"Southern Cross" (Stephen Stills, Richard Curtis, Michael Curtis) – 4:58
"Defying Gravity" (Jesse Winchester) – 3:34

DVD:
"Take Me Out to the Ball Game"
"Jump in Line"
"License to Chill"
"Boat Drinks"
"Fruitcakes"
"Son of a Son of a Sailor"
"Why We Don't Get Drunk" / "Sweet Caroline"
"Respect"
"Jolly Mon Sing"
"Coast of Carolina"
"Cuban Crime of Passion"
"Southern Cross"
"Defying Gravity"

Personnel
The Coral Reefer Band:
Jimmy Buffett – vocals, guitar
Peter Mayer – guitar
Tina Gullickson – vocals
Nadirah Shakoor — vocals
Robert Greenidge — steel drums
Michael Utley — keyboards
Ralph MacDonald — percussion
Jim Mayer – bass guitar
Roger Guth – drums
Mac McAnally — guitar, vocals
Doyle Grisham – steel guitar
Amy Lee — Saxophone
T.C. Mitchell – saxophone
John Lovell – trumpet
Sonny Landreth — guitar
Bill Payne — keyboards
Dr. Charles Steinberg – organ on "Take Me Out to the Ball Game"

References

External links
Live at Fenway Park at BuffettWorld.com

2005 live albums
Live video albums
2005 video albums
Jimmy Buffett live albums
Jimmy Buffett video albums
Mailboat Records live albums
Mailboat Records video albums